Liga Deportiva Universitaria de Quito's 1995 season was the club's 65th year of existence, the 42nd year in professional football, and the 35th in the top level of professional football in Ecuador.

Kits
Supplier: MarathonSponsor(s): Pinturas Wesco, MasterCard, SAETA

Squad

Competitions

Serie A

First stage

First phase

Results

Liguilla Pre Libertadores

Results

Second stage

Group 1

Results

Liguilla Final

Results

External links

RSSSF - 1995 Serie A 

1995